Samurai! is a 1957 autobiographical book by Saburo Sakai co-written with Fred Saito and Martin Caidin. It describes the life and career of Saburō Sakai, the Japanese combat aviator who fought against American fighter pilots in the Pacific Theater of World War II, surviving the war with 64 kills as one of Japan's leading flying aces. Caidin wrote the prose of the book, basing its contents on journalist Fred Saito's extensive interviews with Sakai as well as on Sakai's own memoirs.

According to an analysis of official Japanese records, Sakai had 28 aerial victories, which includes shared victories. The same source claims that Martin Caidin intentionally inflated those numbers to generate publicity for that book. It also attests that many of the stories written in his books are fiction and that the claims made in Samurai! are very different from the content of Japanese works on his life.

See also
Winged Samurai: Saburo Sakai and the Zero Fighter Pilots - 1985 book by Henry Sakaida dealing with the wartime history of Saburō Sakai

References

1957 non-fiction books
Aviation books